is a recurring fictional character in the manga and anime series Speed Racer.

Role in the series
Racer X is a heroic, mysterious, flamboyant, selfless, sympathetic and often brooding soldier of fortune. His 'Racer X' moniker is actually a play on his own first name Rex. Years before the start of the series, when Rex was 18 years old (Speed's current age), he had a falling out with Pops after wrecking the Mach One (the first car Pops ever built) at the end of his first race as a professional driver (seen in flashbacks throughout the series). Racer X drives the number 9 car, the Shooting Star.

Throughout the course of Speed Racer, Racer X's identity is constantly revealed to the audience in almost every episode in which he appears, while Speed is unaware of it. Speed starts to suspect that Racer X might, in fact, be his estranged older brother in the "Challenge of the Masked Racer" saga (episodes 3 and 4). Speed finds out that Racer X is his long lost brother near the end of the series in "The Trick Race".

It was acknowledged by both Pops and Speed over the years that Racer X was the superior driver of the two, and the greatest driver that they had ever seen, but Speed always vowed to defeat Racer X as the two vigorously competed. Speed was often suspicious of Racer X's identity and motives because Racer X would repeatedly, and inexplicably, sacrifice winning races to protect Speed from drivers and others who tried to harm him. The assistance from Racer X nearly always led to Speed winning races, while Racer X came in second place. Racer X always left the scene unnoticed, receding into his secret life.

It was not until the episode "Challenge of the Masked Racer Part 2" that fans of the show finally got to see the face of Racer X. His face was shown a second time near the end of the series in "The Trick Race". In that episode, Speed finally gets a chance to ask Racer X if he is his older brother—only to be interrupted by a punch in the stomach. As Speed lies unconscious, Captain Terror, of the Car Acrobatic Team, soon recognizes the resemblance of Rex under the mask of Racer X. Racer X confesses that he is truly Rex. He then vows to quit automobile racing and becomes a full-time international secret agent instead. As he walks away, he takes off his mask and he tells the unconscious Speed that he will look after him wherever he might go. When Speed wakes up, he finds Racer X's mask on the ground beside him. He is finally convinced that Racer X is in fact his older brother.

Speed Racer: The Next Generation

Racer X appears in Speed Racer: The Next Generation in the episode "The Iron Terror". In the series he is depicted as being alienated from his brother and family due to his investigations into possible conspiracies. His observations are later proven right when it is revealed Zile Zazic was attempting to destroy the racer family. Once, Zile was defeated, Rex and his brother make amends.

Characterization
Pops had told Rex prior to the race that Rex was not yet prepared to compete at the professional racing level. With less than one lap to go in his first major race, Rex was leading and cruising toward victory, but lost control of the car and wrecked it. Pops exploded with anger and berated Rex. In an even more enraged response, Rex fled the family and exiled himself while vowing to become the world's greatest race car driver. During his exile, Rex assumed the mysterious Racer X (a.k.a. Masked Racer) identity, to pursue his racing career.

In several stories Racer X is seen as an international spy or agent and is often responsible for thwarting evil corporate schemes. In this persona, he is often portrayed wearing a white linen suit, Panama hat and wrap around sunglasses. He also seems at times to be working in cooperation with Inspector Detector, though it is not clear if he actually works for the same organization. Inspector Detector also seems to know about Racer X's identity though again it is unclear if this knowledge is mutually shared through the relationship or that the Inspector has a dossier on Racer X.

Mach GoGoGo manga
In Tatsuo Yoshida's original manga series that inspired the Speed Racer anime, Racer X is portrayed similarly to his role in the anime. In the first volume, it is uncertain whether the Racer X character was really Speed's older brother. However, in Yoshida's second volume, it is revealed that Racer X is Speed's brother, Rex. In the second volume, the character's origins are exactly the same in the anime, meaning that Rex also crashed Pops' Mach 1 and fled the family when Pops berated him.

However, the story of Racer X in the original manga is slightly different. Racer X doesn't disguise himself as the deceased Prince Kabala like he did in the anime—for Kabala was alive to race Speed in the Fire Race in the manga. In the end, Racer X comes back to Speed in the Mach 5 as Rex in an abrupt way, revealing his secret life as Racer X and a secret agent to him. The manga ends with Speed and Rex holding hands in a family reunion, promising each other to race together. The concept of the Mach 5 originally being Rex's car in the 2008 film was probably inspired by this scene, the closing scene of the manga.

1999/2000 comic series
In Tommy Yune's prequel comic to Speed Racer, Rex is portrayed as dying while driving the Falling Star (no. 9) in a race against cousin Hank Racer in the Mach 3. Several years later, Racer X appears driving the famed Shooting Star that has a similar appearance to Rex's car and brings shock and anger from the Racer family for dishonoring Rex by racing a car with his numbers and similar color schemes. Racer X is instrumental in helping Speed save Trixie from corrupt interests here and is even praised by Speed before he declares that one day he will learn his identity.

A prequel series was published a year later and told Rex's story between his original crash and "death" in Yune's first prequel. The Racer X series depicted Rex racing and crashing the Mach 1 before being banished from Pops team and struggling to find a sponsor and ride. Eventually he is invited by Prince Kabala of Kapetapek to journey there and meet with the royal leader. Arriving he finds that Kabala wants to hone Rex's racing skills and have him serve him as a diplomat for the South Pacific island-nation against the Western nations (particularly the United States).

Rex learns martial arts, shooting, and racing skills from Kabala before committing a crime punishable by death. Kabala saves him by challenging him to a Fire Race through the volcanoes on the island. Before the race, Rex is given his famed number 9 car (later dubbed the Shooting Star) and successfully beats Kabala as the volcano entrance collapses. He briefly adopts Kabala's identity (by wearing a mask) in order to save the nation from guerillas. At the end of the series, Rex is seen wearing his Racer X mask and loading the Falling Star with Kabala's dead body onto a ship for transport to the race at the beginning of the Speed Racer prequel.

Speed Racer (2008 film)

In the 2008 film adaptation of the manga and anime, Rex Racer is portrayed by Scott Porter while Racer X is portrayed by Matthew Fox. The relationship between Rex and young Speed is built considerably with Speed looking up to Rex as a role model and learning to drive from his older brother. Rex drives the Mach 5 in the film and gives it to Speed when he leaves Pops' racing team to drive for corporate interests. As a result, in this adaptation, Rex does not destroy the car he drove for Pops (the Mach 4) and is portrayed as a reckless and cheating corporate driver responsible for numerous crashes before being killed at the entrance of the Ice Caves in the Casa Cristo cross country race.

When Racer X appears in the film, he has been working as a gun for hire and is feared by many drivers, sponsors, and corporate interests. Racer X works with Inspector Detector tracking the corruption that has taken over racing, and contracts Speed to work with him and Taejo Togokhan (a key witness in the case against Royalton's corruption) in the Casa Cristo that season. Speed begins to suspect that Racer X is in fact Rex, noting that the masked racer appeared exactly two years after his brother died in "The Crucible" and exhibits the same driving styles.

After Taejo Togokhan reneges on the proposed takedown of Royalton Industries after Casa Cristo, Speed recklessly races the Mach 5 at the track where Rex took him to drive when he was younger. Racer X appears and Speed confronts him about his suspicions, especially due to the two's similar driving styles and the fact that Racer X found him at that particular race track. Removing his mask, Speed is depressed to learn that Racer X is not his brother, but Racer X gives the former advice to figure out his own driving and to not let the racing world change the way it is. However, as the film closes, the truth about Rex and his work before his "death" is revealed and he is shown faking his death in the caves, detonating his car, and undergoing cosmetic surgery afterward to alter his appearance in order to take on the corruption without bringing harm to his family. In the end, as in all his other versions, Racer X is Rex Racer. When Inspector Detector asks Rex whether he made a mistake by leaving his family, Rex responds to him saying that "If I did, it's a mistake I'll have to live with.", meaning Rex has to continue hiding his identity in order to keep his brother safe.

Cultural references

Racer X was a 1980s heavy metal band founded by future Mr. Big guitarist Paul Gilbert.

Dallas band Slow Roosevelt recorded the song "Racer X" on their album Weightless.

The band Big Black's 1984 EP is Racer-X. The title track is full of Speed Racer references.

The cartoon Dexter's Laboratory has a Speed Racer parody episode, "Mock 5". In it, the main character Dexter's older sister Dee Dee portrays both Racer X and Spritle.

The comic strip Liberty Meadows has a story line around a dachshund ("wiener dog") race. One of the canine competitors is named Wiener X and wears a mask like Racer X.

In the animated TV show Fetch with Ruff Ruffman (Season 4, Episode 1), Scruff Ruffman was Racer X in a Luge Race.

In the film The 40 Year Old Virgin, there is a sticker on the protagonist's fridge depicting Racer X.

In the animated comedy series The Venture Bros. episode “The Unicorn in Captivity” the character Copy Cat is in disguise as a character named Driver X, an obvious homage to Racer X.

References

Comics characters introduced in 1967
Fictional racing drivers
Fictional secret agents and spies
Speed Racer
Martial artist characters in anime and manga
Male characters in film
Fictional mercenaries in comics
Vigilante characters in comics